Gaeumannomyces graminis var. graminis is a plant pathogen. This fungal pathogen produces extensive damage on the sheath of rice, causing black spots which protrude from the infected. This pathogen also generates a discoloration in the foliage of a plant which tends to show a straw orange colouration.

References

External links 
 Index Fungorum
 USDA ARS Fungal Database

Further reading 
 

Fungal plant pathogens and diseases
Rice diseases
Magnaporthales